Richard Florence O'Kelly (born 8 January 1957) is an English former footballer turned manager; whose most recent position was Dean Smith's assistant head coach at Premier League side Aston Villa.

He began his career at Walsall in 1979, as they won promotion into the Third Division in 1979–80, where they remained for his next six seasons at Fellows Park, during which time he scored 56 goals in 204 league games. He was sold on to Port Vale for a £6,000 fee in July 1986, before returning to Walsall on a free transfer January 1988. Helping the "Saddlers" to win promotion via the play-offs, he moved on to Grimsby Town, before retiring due to injury the following year.

After retiring due to injury in 1989 he took up coaching and has served as the assistant manager at Hereford United, Bournemouth, and Doncaster Rovers. He became a manager for the first time with Hereford United in March 2012, but quit the post two months later after the "Bulls" were relegated out of the Football League. He immediately returned to the number two role at former club Walsall, before following manager Dean Smith to Brentford in November 2015.

Playing career

Walsall
O'Kelly started his career with Alvechurch before moving into the English Football League with Walsall in 1979, after being signed by manager Alan Buckley. The "Saddlers" were promoted into the Third Division as Fourth Division as runners-up in 1979–80, two points behind champions Huddersfield Town. Walsall retained their third tier status in 1980–81 by finishing one place and one point above the drop zone. They came even closer to relegation in 1981–82, finishing ahead of relegated Wimbledon on goal difference. They then improved, finishing tenth in 1982–83, before finishing sixth in 1983–84, eight points behind promoted Sheffield United. However Walsall dropped to eleventh in 1984–85, and O'Kelly was the club's top scorer with eighteen goals. They finished sixth in 1985–86, nine points behind promoted Derby County. In his seven years at Fellows Park he racked up over 200 appearances, with a goal rate of one goal every four games.

Port Vale
In July 1986, the cultured striker joined fellow West Midlands and Third Division side Port Vale for a £6,000 fee. His Vale Park career started with a bang as he scored on his debut in a 2–2 draw at Middlesbrough on 23 August 1986. After playing the next three matches he was struck down with an injury to his knee ligaments, which required an operation the following January. Sidelined for the rest of the 1986–87 season, he returned to the first team at the beginning of the 1987–88 season, and scored three goals in 22 appearances.

Return to Walsall
In January 1988, John Rudge allowed him to return to Walsall on a free transfer. The club won promotion at the end of the 1987 season under Tommy Coakley's stewardship, beating Bristol City 4–0 in the play-off final. He then joined former manager Alan Buckley at Fourth Division Grimsby Town, as the "Mariners" posted a ninth-place finish in 1988–89; O'Kelly finished his playing career in 1989 following a bad injury sustained playing for Grimsby in an encounter with Doncaster Rovers.

Management career

Coaching
After finishing his playing career, O'Kelly worked as Port Vale's community officer from August 1990 to May 1991 before returning to Blundell Park as a youth team coach. He left Grimsby for the same position at West Bromwich Albion in 1994. He spent seven years at The Hawthorns as youth team coach, and then six months at Aston Villa, before joining Hereford United in 2002 as assistant manager to Graham Turner.

He was appointed assistant manager of Bournemouth in the summer of 2004 and two years later followed manager Sean O'Driscoll to Doncaster Rovers. Under the pair's first full season at Rovers the club gained promotion into the Championship after winning the League One play-off final in 2008 against Leeds United. The pair were placed on 'gardening leave' by the club in September 2011, with Rovers sitting bottom of the Championship.

In November 2011 he announced his return to Walsall, coaching for the club on a voluntary basis.

Hereford United
On 5 March 2012, O'Kelly was appointed manager of Hereford United, replacing Jamie Pitman, who stayed on at Edgar Street as a coach. He took charge with the club two places and two points above the League Two relegation zone, and signed a contract until the end of the 2011–12 season. On taking charge he said "It's my first job as manager but what better team to start with. We've got 12 games to show and prove to people just what we can do." He got his first point in charge at the club the following day, when his side squandered a two-goal lead to draw 2–2 with Macclesfield Town at Moss Rose. Four days later they beat Morecambe 1–0 at the Globe Arena, further boosting their chances of survival. He later signed full-back James Chambers and winger James Baxendale on loan from Doncaster Rovers. To avoid relegation on the last day of the campaign, the "Bulls" needed to beat Torquay United and hope Burton Albion could avoid defeat at home to Barnet. Chairman David Keyte said that he should have appointed O'Kelly earlier in the season. His team won a futile 3–2 victory, as a win for Barnet sent Hereford back down to the Conference. He was asked to remain in charge for the subsequent Conference campaign, but declined the offer.

Return to coaching
In June 2012, Dean Smith appointed O'Kelly as his assistant manager at League One side Walsall. In accepting the job he turned down Sean O'Driscoll's offer to join the coaching staff at Crawley Town. However he went on to quit Walsall for Championship side Bristol City in January 2013, after O'Driscoll was appointed as the "Robins" new manager. Four months later he resigned, citing personal reasons. He made an immediate return to Walsall to once again work as Dean Smith's assistant. 

Once Smith was appointed as manager of Championship side Brentford in November 2015, he immediately named O'Kelly as his assistant. 

O'Kelly went on to follow Smith to Aston Villa in October 2018. The "Villans" went on to win promotion to the Premier League with a 2–1 victory over Derby County in the 2019 EFL Championship play-off final. On 12 August 2021, Aston Villa announced O'Kelly's decision to leave his role there.

Career statistics

Playing statistics
Source:

A.  The "Other" column constitutes appearances and goals in the League Cup, Football League Trophy, Football League play-offs and Full Members Cup.

Managerial statistics

Honours
Walsall
Football League Fourth Division second-place promotion: 1979–80
Football League Third Division play-offs: 1988

References

External links
 Profile at the League Managers Association website

1957 births
Living people
Sportspeople from West Bromwich
English footballers
Association football forwards
Alvechurch F.C. players
Walsall F.C. players
Port Vale F.C. players
Grimsby Town F.C. players
English Football League players
English football managers
Hereford United F.C. managers
English Football League managers
Association football coaches
Port Vale F.C. non-playing staff
Grimsby Town F.C. non-playing staff
West Bromwich Albion F.C. non-playing staff
Aston Villa F.C. non-playing staff
Hereford United F.C. non-playing staff
AFC Bournemouth non-playing staff
Walsall F.C. non-playing staff
Doncaster Rovers F.C. non-playing staff
Bristol City F.C. non-playing staff
Brentford F.C. non-playing staff